Md Nazimuddin, psc is a retired lieutenant general of Bangladesh Army. He previously served as General Officer Commanding (GOC) of ARTDOC and 55 Infantry Division and Jessore area commander and served as Chief of General Staff (CGS) of Bangladesh Army. He was also Director General of Bangladesh Ansar & VDP. He also served as a Directing Staff in Defence Services Command and Staff College (DSCSC), Mirpur Cantonment. He was commissioned in 8th BMA long course in 1983. He is a graduate of Defence Services Command & Staff College (DSCSC), Mirpur Cantonment.

References 

Bangladesh Army generals